John Wheeler (9 December 1844 – 22 September 1908) was an English first-class cricketer active 1873–87 who played for Nottinghamshire. He was born and died in Sutton Bonington.

References

1844 births
1908 deaths
English cricketers
Nottinghamshire cricketers
People from Sutton Bonington
Cricketers from Nottinghamshire
Marylebone Cricket Club cricketers
North v South cricketers